The 1990 Boise State Broncos football team represented Boise State University in the 1990 NCAA Division I-AA football season. The Broncos competed in the Big Sky Conference and played their home games on campus at Bronco Stadium in Boise, Idaho. The Broncos were led by fourth-year head coach Skip Hall, Boise State finished the season 10–4 overall and 6–2 in conference.

The Broncos returned to the Division I-AA playoffs and advanced to the semifinals, but fell to conference rival Nevada in triple overtime. Three Big Sky teams were selected for the 16-team postseason and all won their openers: Idaho fell in the quarters, BSU in the semis and Nevada in the final.

Schedule

Source:

References

Boise State
Boise State Broncos football seasons
Boise State Broncos football